
Year 509 (DIX) was a common year starting on Thursday (link will display the full calendar) of the Julian calendar. At the time, it was known as the Year of the Consulship of Inportunus without colleague (or, less frequently, year 1262 Ab urbe condita). The denomination 509 for this year has been used since the early medieval period, when the Anno Domini calendar era became the prevalent method in Europe for naming years.

Events 
 By place 
 Europe 
 Clovis I (Chlodowech) becomes the first Catholic king of the Franks, uniting all the Frankish tribes under his rule. He controls an immense territory in Gaul (modern France), and delivers a major blow for the Church against the Arian heresy.

Births 
 Kinmei, emperor of Japan (d. 571) 
 Wei Xiaokuan, general of Western Wei (d. 580)

Deaths 
 Chlodoric, king of the Ripuarian Franks
 Sigobert the Lame, king of the Ripuarian Franks

References